Heliophanus jacksoni is a jumping spider species in the genus Heliophanus.  It was first described by Wanda Wesołowska in 2011 and can be found in Kenya.

References

Endemic fauna of Kenya
Salticidae
Fauna of Kenya
Spiders of Africa
Spiders described in 2011
Taxa named by Wanda Wesołowska